Ravi Krishnaji Paranjape (9 October 1935 – 11 June 2022) was an Indian painter, illustrator and author based in Pune. He worked in the fields of advertising, architecture and publishing before becoming an independent artist, painter and author.

Career 
Ravi Paranjape was born on 9 October 1935 in Belgaum, Karnaka. Soon after completing his education and apprenticeships, he started a career as an illustrator. He worked for several companies including well-known publication houses and studios in Mumbai.

Death 
Ravi Paranjape died in a private hospital in Pune at the age of 86.

Awards 
Ravi Paranjape has received several awards for his artistic and literary accomplishments including the following:

 1978 - Communication Arts Guild (CAG) Award for the best published advertisement for 1978
 1995 - ICAG Hall of Fame Award in the field of applied arts.
 1996 - Dayawati Modi Foundation's and ‘Bhairuratan Damani Award’ for his autobiography ‘Brush Mileage’
 2002 - The Government of Maharashtra's Veteran Artist Award
 2003 - The Pune Pride Award
 2006 - Godavari Gaurav Award, presented by Kusumagraj Pratishthan
 2022 - ROOPDHAR Lifetime Achievement Award, The Bombay Art Society

Books 
Ravi Paranjape is the author of several books including the following:

 Portfolio  - Outdoor
 The World of My Illustrations
 Sketching & Drawing
 Diwali
 Master  Artist
 Shikhare Ranga Reshanchi (e-book)

References 

1935 births
2022 deaths
Indian painters
Indian illustrators
People from Belgaum